Jahongir Turdiev (born 5 June 1993) is an Uzbek sport wrestler, who competes in the men's Greco Roman category. He claimed silver medal in the men's 97 kg event during the 2019 Asian Wrestling Championships after losing to Uzur Dzhuzupbekov.

References 

1993 births
Living people
Uzbekistani male sport wrestlers
Wrestlers at the 2018 Asian Games
Asian Games competitors for Uzbekistan
Asian Wrestling Championships medalists
21st-century Uzbekistani people